Oh Hye-won is a South Korean actress and model. She is known for her roles in dramas such as Children of Nobody, Designated Survivor: 60 Days and Dinner Mate. She also appeared in movies Keys to the Heart, Tazza: One Eyed Jack and #Alive.

Filmography

Television series

Film

References

External links
 
 

1986 births
Living people
21st-century South Korean actresses
South Korean female models
South Korean television actresses
South Korean film actresses